The Edgewater Public Schools is a community public school district that serves students in kindergarten through sixth grades from Edgewater, in Bergen County, New Jersey, United States.

As of the 2018–19 school year, the district, comprising two schools, had an enrollment of 1,022 students and 70.3 classroom teachers (on an FTE basis), for a student–teacher ratio of 14.5:1. With district enrollment increasing rapidly, George Washington School opened in September 2012, having been constructed with a third floor to accommodate enrollment growth in the district that was anticipated to rise from 628 in 2011 to as much as 925 in 2015.

The district is classified by the New Jersey Department of Education as being in District Factor Group "GH", the third-highest of eight groupings. District Factor Groups organize districts statewide to allow comparison by common socioeconomic characteristics of the local districts. From lowest socioeconomic status to highest, the categories are A, B, CD, DE, FG, GH, I and J.

For seventh through twelfth grades, public school students from the borough are sent to the Leonia Public Schools as part of a sending/receiving relationship. Schools in the district attended by Edgewater students (with 2018–19 enrollment data from the National Center for Education Statistics) are 
Leonia Middle School with 533 students in grades 6 - 8 (Edgewater students attend for grades 7&8) and
Leonia High School with 740 students in grades 9 - 12.

School
Schools in the district (with 2018–19 enrollment data from the National Center for Education Statistics) are:
George Washington School with 554 students in grades PreK-2
Billy J. Cunningham, Principal
Eleanor Van Gelder School with 447 students in grades 3-6
 Mrs Michele Higgins, Principal

Administration
Core members of the district's administration are:
Mrs. Siobhan Tauchert, Superintendent
Mr Wally Lindsley, Board Secretary / Business Administrator
Mrs Michele Higgins, Principal, Eleanor Van Gelder School
Mr Billy Cunningham, Principal, George Washington School 
Mr Joseph Tramutolo, Director of Special Services
Mr Richard Gannon, Supervisor of Buildings & Grounds

Board of Education
The district's board of education, with five members, sets policy and oversees the fiscal and educational operation of the district through its administration. As a Type II school district, the board's trustees are elected directly by voters to serve three-year terms of office on a staggered basis, with either one or two seats up for election each year held (since 2012) as part of the November general election. The board appoints a superintendent to oversee the day-to-day operation of the district.

References

External links 
Edgewater Schools School

School Data for the Edgewater Public Schools, National Center for Education Statistics
Leonia Public Schools

Edgewater, New Jersey
New Jersey District Factor Group GH
School districts in Bergen County, New Jersey